Ramazan Özcan ( born 28 June 1984) is an Austrian former professional footballer of Turkish descent, who played as a goalkeeper.

Career

Club
Özcan started his professional career with Austria Lustenau in 2003, and moved to Red Bull Salzburg in the summer of 2006. He spent one season and a half with Salzburg as the club's third-choice goalkeeper and only made three Bundesliga appearances in the final stages of the 2006–07 season.

He moved to German 2. Bundesliga side 1899 Hoffenheim in the winter break of the 2007–08 season on an initial six-month loan and played all seventeen league games in the second half of the season as the club secured promotion to the Bundesliga. In these seventeen games, he only conceded twenty goals. He was signed by the club on a five-year contract upon the end of the season, but on 30 December 2009 he left Germany to sign on loan for Beşiktaş.

International
Following Helge Payer's withdrawal due to illness, Özcan was named to Austria's 23-man squad for the UEFA Euro 2008 finals, but did not play any matches during the tournament. He made his international debut in a friendly match against Italy on 20 August 2008, replacing Alex Manninger at half-time. The match ended in a 2–2 draw. He represented the national team at 2016 UEFA Euro.

Personal life
Özcan also holds Turkish citizenship.

References

External links

 Ramazan Özcan at kicker.de 
 
 
 
 

1984 births
Living people
People from Hohenems
Austrian people of Turkish descent
Association football goalkeepers
Turkish footballers
Austrian footballers
Austria international footballers
UEFA Euro 2008 players
UEFA Euro 2016 players
Austrian expatriate footballers
SC Austria Lustenau players
FC Red Bull Salzburg players
TSG 1899 Hoffenheim players
Beşiktaş J.K. footballers
FC Ingolstadt 04 players
Bayer 04 Leverkusen players
Austrian Football Bundesliga players
Expatriate footballers in Germany
Bundesliga players
2. Bundesliga players
Süper Lig players
Austria under-21 international footballers
Footballers from Vorarlberg
Citizens of Turkey through descent
Austrian expatriate sportspeople in Germany